Black Christ may refer to:

 Race and appearance of Jesus#African
a black or blackened wooden sculpture of Jesus Christ, such as:
  Cristo Negro (Portobelo), celebrated in the town of Portobelo in the Colón Province of Panama with a festival on October 21. 
 Black Christ of Esquipulas
 Temple of Santa María Ahuacatlán, Valle de Bravo, Mexico